Kim Woo-rim (김우림), known professionally as D.Ark (디아크), is a South Korean-Chinese rapper. He made his first debut on December 30, 2020 with the digital single "Potential".

Career
Prior to his official debut, D.Ark first appeared as a contestant on Show Me the Money 777. During his time on the show, D.Ark came under fire for allegations of sexual assault released by his girlfriend via Instagram. Following his official apology, D.Ark continued to participate on the show but had much of his footage edited out by the producers. He would also participate in Show Me the Money 9 in 2020.

On December 30, 2020, it was revealed that D.Ark had signed a contract, with P Nation releasing a music video for his debut single "Potential" on the same day.

In early 2021, D.Ark participated as a contestant on High School Rapper 4.

On May 4, 2021, P Nation announced that D.Ark was soon to be making his first comeback under the label. D.Ark's first EP EP1 Genius, released on May 13, 2021. The album featured notable guests such as Swings and Changmo.

On September 7, 2021, D.Ark became embroiled in controversy after an Instagram post which showed him posing with alcoholic drinks, implying he was drinking underage.
In November 2021, it was reported that D.Ark had officially left P Nation after being signed for less than a year.

On December 11, 2021, it was widely reported that D.Ark was potentially dating the daughter of trot singer Lee Seung-ah, who was 8 years older than him. On December 29, 2021, D.Ark released his first mixtape independently, titled DKHVKY.

On August 10, 2022, D.Ark released his first full length studio album, The End of Puberty.

Discography

Studio albums

EPs and mixtapes

Singles

Filmography

References

2004 births
Living people
South Korean male rappers
South Korean hip hop singers
21st-century South Korean male singers
Show Me the Money (South Korean TV series) contestants
South Korean singer-songwriters
South Korean male singer-songwriters